Wah Janaab is an Indian television series that aired in 1984 on DD National. Chitrartha Singh, who gained acclaim earlier from his Punjabi film Chann Pardesi had directed and late satirist Sharad Joshi had penned the series based after 1878-1883 Ratan Nath Dhar Sarshar's classic novel Fasana-E-Azad. This was the first TV appearance of actor and compere Shekhar Suman, where he played a paan spewing Lakhnawi nawab. Kiran Juneja played his love interest and Shailendra Goyal played hero's sidekick in the serial.

Cast 
 Shekhar Suman
 Kiran Juneja
 Shailendra Goyal

References

1980s Indian television series
1984 Indian television series debuts
DD National original programming
Television shows based on Indian novels
Television shows set in Uttar Pradesh